Struggle is a 2013 Chinese teen film directed and written by Guan Xiaojie, starring Zhao Yihuan, Wen Zhuo, Hu Yue, Wen Mengyang, You Yitian, and Ruo Qi. Within a month the film grossed ￥200 million in China.

Cast
 Zhao Yihuan as Li Ruoxi
 Wen Zhuo as Wen Feng
 Wen Mengyang as Qiao Zi
 Hu Yue as Mengmeng
 You Yitian as Siqi
 Ruo Qi as Sister CICI
 Qin Hanlei as Qin Shou
 Li Hongtao as the deputy director
 Yin Zhe as Sister Mimi

Production
This film was shot in Beijing Xingmei Jinchen Studios.

Music
 You Yitian - "One Day"
 Zhang Yuanyuan - "The One Which You Were In The Past"
 Zhao Yihuan - "Eidolon Wonderland"

References

External links
 

2010s teen films
Chinese teen films
Films directed by Guan Xiaojie
Chinese coming-of-age films